A Spice for Life, also released as Master Cheng, (original Finnish title: Mestari Cheng) is a 2019 Finnish romantic drama comedy film directed by Mika Kaurismäki. The film stars Anna-Maija Tuokko, Chu Pak Hong, Kari Väänänen, Lucas Hsuan and Vesa-Matti Loiri, with dialogue in Finnish, Mandarin, and English.

The story concerns the Chinese master cook Cheng (Hong), who travels to the small village of Raattama in Kittilä, Lapland, with his son. Cheng's cooking causes an overhaul of local life and cures local people of ailments ranging from high blood pressure to menstrual pain. The story also touches on aspects of childlessness and of losing one's spouse.

The film was premiered in Finland 27 September 2019 and in China in January 2020.

Plot
After the death of his wife, the Chinese cook Cheng travels to the Finnish village of Pohjanjoki with his son to meet his benefactor Fongtron, who had helped him in a difficult situation back home in Shanghai. Upon arriving in Pohjanjoki, Cheng finds out no one knows who Fongtron is. It later becomes apparent that Fongtron was a man named Pekka Forsström, who had died a couple of years earlier.

As a busload of Chinese tourists arrive in the village, Cheng helps the restaurant owner Sirkka take care of them. Instead of her basic dish of pork bits with mashed potatoes, Cheng makes the tourists Chinese noodle soup from simple ingredients. The tourists love the food, causing more tourists to travel to the village. Sirkka's life changes as a result.

As well as Chinese tourists, the Finnish residents also find Cheng's food tasty. He explains to them that Chinese food makes one lucky and well. This turns out to work as his food cures people of ailments ranging from high blood pressure to menstrual pain. In return, the locals treat Cheng to Finnish experiences: holidays on the lake shore, the Finnish sauna and tango dancing.

With Sirkka's help, Cheng's son Niu Niu gets over his homesickness for China and makes friends with the town's children.

Cheng and Sirkka fall in love and travel to China to marry.

Cast
 Chu Pak Hong as Cheng
 Anna-Maija Tuokko as Sirkka
 Lucas Hsuan as Niu Niu
 Kari Väänänen as Romppainen
 Vesa-Matti Loiri as Vilppula
 Paula Miettinen as Mervi

Production
Two-thirds of the film's budget of €2.9 million came from China. The film was shot for six weeks in summer 2018 in Raattama, Sodankylä, and in China.

The film premiered in Finland on 27 September 2019 and had its Chinese premiere in January 2020 during the Chinese New Year.

The film won the first prize in the public's choice awards at the Lübeck Nordic Film Days festival in autumn 2019 and received 93% of the votes, which was a new record during the festival's history.

The film was sold to many countries. It received its premiere in Germany on 30 July 2020 in 146 cinemas, gaining a huge public success. The film received its premiere in Austria on the same day. Next the film came to cinemas in Switzerland on 20 August 2020 and later in autumn in the United Kingdom and Japan.

References

External links
 
 

2019 films
Finnish romantic comedy films
Chinese romantic comedy films
Films directed by Mika Kaurismäki